Như Loan (born April 20, 1981) is a Vietnamese singer who is currently signed under the music label Thúy Nga; one of the largest overseas Vietnamese music productions that is responsible for Paris By Night, a hit musical variety show. Như Loan was introduced to Thúy Nga Paris By Night through designer Calvin Hiep, whom she has modeled for in the past. She started her singing career as a back-up singer in Paris By Night and was later given the opportunity to sing on stage as a professional singer in Paris By Night 62. Như Loan sang her debut solo in Paris By Night 63 with the song “Men Say Tình Ái ”.

Như Loan released her first solo CD in 2006 titled Tình Lặng Câm, as well as a duet CD titled Sunday Buồn with singer Bảo Hân, and a group CD titled Mong Anh Sẽ Đến with singers Bảo Hân, Loan Châu, and Tú Quyên. She has also been appearing in Thúy Nga's Paris by Night videos and DVDs since 2001. Như Loan has released her second solo CD in mid-2008, planning to release other products in the near future.

Biography 
'Như Loan' is her stage name which was given to her by her producers. She was named after a famous Vietnamese actress known for her beauty. She currently resides in Costa Mesa, California with her Husband and two children.

Music 

Như Loan has released several CDs that have become top-sellers throughout the years. Her first CD, released in 2002, was Mong Anh Sẽ Đến which featured herself and other singers of Thúy Nga: Bảo Hân, Loan Châu, and Tú Quyên. In 2003, she released a duet CD with singer Bảo Hân titled Sunday Buồn. After continuous requests and demands from fans, Như Loan released her debut solo CD titled Tình Lặng Câm in July 2006. She finished her second solo CD "Trai tim da duoc yeu" in 2008. Như Loan is also working on other projects, as well as picking out songs for her third solo CD, set to release in the near future

Albums

Best of Như Loan
Singer: Như Loan

Special guest: Tran Thai Hoa, Lam Nhat Tien, Nguyen Thang, & Nguyet Anh

Mong Anh Sẽ Đến
ft. Như Loan, Bảo Hân, Loan Châu, & Tú Quyên

Sunday Buồn
ft. Như Loan & Bảo Hân

Paris By Night 

Như Loan's first appearance in Thúy Nga was in Paris By Night 57: Am Nhac Va Thoi Trang 1 as a model in Calvin Hiep's fashion show. She also appeared as a back-up singer in Paris By Night 58: Nhung Sac Mau Trong Ky Niem. Như Loan's first performance on stage as a professional and contracted singer of Thúy Nga was in Paris By Night 62: Âm Nhạc Không Biên Giới 1 in 2001.

The following table lists the Paris by Night shows that Như Loan took part in:

External links 
 
http://www.myspace.com/therealnhuloan
http://www.thuynga.com
 CD Best of Như Loan

1981 births
Living people
Vietnamese pop singers
21st-century Vietnamese women singers
People from Lâm Đồng Province